Zola Predosa is a comune (municipality) in the Metropolitan City of Bologna in the Italian region Emilia-Romagna, located about  west of Bologna.

Twin towns — sister cities
Zola Predosa is twinned with:

  Timrå Municipality, Sweden

Sport 
The main football club of the municipality is the Axys Zola.

References

External links
 

Cities and towns in Emilia-Romagna